Ida Kraus Ragins, née Kraus (10 October 1894 – September 1985), was a Russian Empire-born American biochemist.

Life and work
Ida Kraus Ragins was born in the Russian Empire and moved to the United States before 1915. That year she started work as an assistant in quantitative analysis in the Department of Chemistry of the University of Chicago, possibly as a student job, as she received her B.A. in 1918 and her M.S. from the university the following year. Kraus Ragins taught for a year at the Oklahoma College for Women, before returning to Chicago to work on her Ph.D. which she received in 1924. She then worked as an instructor in biochemistry at the university until she became a senior chemist at Cook County Hospital in 1937. Kraus Ragins married Oscar B. Ragins, a physician, the same year that she received her Ph.D. and had her daughter in 1926 and a son in 1929.

Kraus Ragins specialized in protein specificity reactions and amino acids before she moved to Northwestern Medical School in 1946 where she became a senior chemist in experimental medicine. She remained there for only three years before accepting a position at the Chicago College of Osteopathic Medicine as head of the department of biochemistry in 1949. No further information on her life is available.

Notes

References

1894 births
1985 deaths
20th-century American biochemists
American centenarians
University of Chicago alumni
University of Chicago faculty
Women biochemists
Women centenarians
Emigrants from the Russian Empire to the United States